Trapped (also known as Baker County, U.S.A. and The Killer Instinct) is a 1982  Canadian-American thriller-horror film  directed  by William Fruet and starring  Henry Silva.

Premise 
A group of college students witness a redneck murdering his wife's lover. They then become his target.

Cast 

 Henry Silva as Henry Chatwill 
 Nicholas Campbell as Roger Michaels 
 Barbara Gordon as Miriam Chatwill 
 Gina Dick as Diana 
 Joy Thompson as Caroline 
 Danone Camden as Amy
 Ralph Benmergui  as Lee 
 Allan Royal  as Leonard  
 Sam Malkin as Jeb 
 Stuart Culpepper as Myles

Production 
The film was shot in the state of Georgia and the province of Ontario.

Reception   
Mondo Digital says the film was "Made at the height of Canadian tax-shelter film-making, which generated such filmmakers as David Cronenberg, Trapped is another of the country’s Deliverance-inspired revenge films after the excellent Rituals..."

References

External links 

1982 films
1980s horror thriller films
American horror thriller films
Canadian thriller films
English-language Canadian films
Films directed by William Fruet
Films scored by Eric Robertson (composer)
1982 horror films
1980s English-language films
1980s American films
1980s Canadian films